Van Council is the owner of Van Michael Salons, which is located at Atlanta in the U.S. state of Georgia. In 1984, Van and his brother Michael launched the first Van Michael Salon, a full-service Aveda Concept Salon in Atlanta, Georgia.  The first addition was the New Talents Salon, where clients can come and get a service but at a lower cost.  Van Michael and New Talents Salons are now found in seven locations in Georgia.  In 2001 Van partnered with a group of salon investors to franchise Van Council branded salons in Japan.

Awards

Best Women's Haircut, Atlanta Business Chronicle
Editor's, Beauty Press
Top 20 Salon Owner in the Country, Salon Today Magazine, – North American Hairdresser of the Year, North American Hairstyling Awards
Best Salon, Atlanta Journal and Constitution
Readers Choice, Atlanta Business Chronicles
Four Time Winner of NAHA, North American Hairstyling Awards
Avant Garde Stylist of the Year, North American Hairstyling Awards
Makeover Stylist of the Year, two-time winner, North American Hairstyling Awards
World Masters Award for Lifetime Achievement, Aveda Corporation
Best Haircut and Overall Look, KMS
Best Haircolor, Framesi Haircolor
Best Haircut and Overall Style, Zotos
Top 75 Educators of the Century, Modern Salon
Lifetime Achievement Award, Aveda Corporation
Lifetime Achievement Award, Art and Fashion Group

References

American hairdressers